Montpellier Hérault Sport Club Féminines (commonly referred to as simply Montpellier) is a French women's football club based in Villeneuve-lès-Maguelone, a commune in the arrondissement of Montpellier. The club was founded in 1990. Montpellier play in the Division 1 Féminine having finished in 4th place in the 2009–10 season. The club is currently managed by Frédéric Mendy.

Montpellier hosts its home matches at the Stade Joseph-Blanc, a 1,000-capacity stadium that is situated in Villeneuve-lès-Maguelone. The club also hosts matches at the Stade de la Mosson in Montpellier, where the men's team plays.

History 
The club was formed in 1990 under the name Montpellier-Le-Crès following the fusion of local clubs Racing Club de Paillade and Entente Cressoise. In 2001, the women's club became the women's section of the football club Montpellier HSC. Since joining Montpellier, the women's section has won the Division 1 Féminine twice in 2004 and 2005 and the Challenge de France three in 2006, 2007, and 2009 making the club one of the most successful women's football clubs in French football. Montpellier reached the semi-finals of the 2005–06 edition of the UEFA Women's Cup and, during the 2009–10 season, reached the quarter-finals of the inaugural edition of the UEFA Women's Champions League losing to Swedish club Umeå on the away goals rule.

Montpellier has produced several well-known players that have played for the France women's national football team. Hoda Lattaf is a current member of the Montpellier first-team and was one of the leading players of the national team during her ten-year stint from 1997–2007. Lattaf finished her international career with 112 appearances and 31 goals. Current internationals and former players include Sonia Bompastor and Camille Abily who are both players abroad in the WPS in the United States. Internationals Louisa Necib, Élodie Thomis, and Laure Lepailleur all played for Montpellier before joining Olympique Lyonnais.

Players

Current squad

Former notable players

  Camille Abily
  Viviane Asseyi
  Karima Benameur
  Charlotte Bilbault
  Delphine Blanc
  Sonia Bompastor
  Élise Bussaglia
  Marie-Laure Delie
  Céline Deville
  Ludivine Diguelman
  Kelly Gadéa
  Sakina Karchaoui
  Hoda Lattaf
  Claire Lavogez
  Laure Lepailleur
  Sarah M'Barek
  Élisa de Almeida
  Marina Makanza
  Ophélie Meilleroux
  Louisa Necib
  Mélissa Plaza
  Élodie Ramos
  Léa Rubio
  Julie Soyer
  Élodie Thomis
  Laëtitia Tonazzi
  Sandie Toletti
  Sabrina Viguier
  Andressa Alves
  Francine Zouga
  Luna Gevitz
  Aya Sameshima
  Rumi Utsugi
  Jen Beattie
  Virginia Torrecilla
  Josefine Öqvist

Record in UEFA competitions 

 Further details: Montpellier HSC (Women) in European football
All results (away, home and aggregate) list Montpellier's goal tally first.

a First leg.

Honours

Official
Division 1 Féminine (Champions of France)
 Winners (2): 2004, 2005
 Runners-up (4): 2006, 2007, 2009, 2017
Coupe de France
 Winners (3): 2006, 2007, 2009
 Runners-up (6): 2003, 2010, 2011, 2012, 2015, 2016

Invitational
Pyrénées Cup
Winners (2): 2008, 2010

References

External links
 Women's section on official website 

Women's football clubs in France
Montpellier HSC
Association football clubs established in 1990
Association football clubs established in 2001
1990 establishments in France
2001 establishments in France
Division 1 Féminine clubs
Football clubs in Occitania (administrative region)